Mendy is a given name and can refer to:

People
Mendy Rudolph (1926–1979), professional basketball referee 
Mendy López (born 1973), Dominican baseball utility player 
Mendy Pellin, Hassidic comic
Mendy Samstein (1938–2007), American civil rights activist
Mendy Commanda a 1998 World Series of Poker champion in $1,000 Ladies - Limit 7 Card Stud
Mendy Fry (born 1969), American dragster and funny car driver 
Emanuel Weiss (1906–1944), nicknamed "Mendy," professional hitman 

Fiction
Mendy and the Golem, comic book featuring Jewish characters

See also
Mendy (disambiguation)
Mendy (surname)

Feminine given names